The Guldbagge for Best Director is a Swedish film award presented annually by the Swedish Film Institute (SFI) as part of the Guldbagge Awards (Swedish: "Guldbaggen") to directors working in the Swedish motion picture industry.

History 
Throughout the past 50 years, SFI has presented a total of 50 Best Director awards to 40 different directors. Along with the categories Best Film, Best Actor in a Leading Role and Best Actress in a Leading Role, the award for Best director were one of the four original price categories which was presented at the first award ceremony in 1964. At the 1st Guldbagge Awards (1963/1964), Ingmar Bergman was awarded the first Guldbagge for his film The Silence. Since then, the prize has been awarded every year, except in 1971 where the only prize for best film was awarded, and in 1980 where only the categories Best Film, Best Actor along with the Ingmar Bergman Award. At both the 30th Guldbagge Awards (1994) and the 42nd Guldbagge Awards (2006), Best Director was presented to a co-directing team, rather than to an individual director.

The Guldbagge Awards for Best Director and Best Film have been very closely linked throughout their history. Of the 55 films that have been awarded Best Film, 24 have also been awarded Best Director. The first one to achieve this was Ingmar Bergman, whose film The Silence won the Best Film award at the first 1st Guldbagge Awards. The last one who achieved this was Magnus von Horn through his film, The Here After at the 51st Guldbagge Awards (2015).

The first woman who won the award for Best Director was Marianne Ahrne, for the film Near and Far Away (1976). Besides her, only nine women have ever been awarded for Best Director: Suzanne Osten for The Mozart Brothers (1986), Åsa Faringer for The Daughter of the Puma (1994), Ella Lemhagen for Tsatsiki, morsan och polisen (1999), Catti Edfeldt and Ylva Gustavsson for Kidz in da Hood (2006), Lisa Siwe for Glowing Stars (2009), Pernilla August for Beyond (2010), and Gabriela Pichler for Eat Sleep Die (2012). Since 1991, when the nomination system was introduced with three nominees, the number of female directors has increased significantly, with a total of 22 women. The first woman that got nominated was Susanne Bier for the film Freud's Leaving Home (1991).

Winners and nominees 
Each Guldbagge Awards ceremony is listed chronologically below along with the winner of the Guldbagge Award for Directing and the film associated with the award. Before 1991 the awards did not announce nominees, only winners. In the columns under the winner of each award are the other nominees for best director, which are listed from 1991 and forward.

For the first nineteen ceremonies, the eligibility period spanned two calendar years. For example, the 2nd Guldbagge Awards presented on October 15, 1965, recognized films that were released between July, 1964 and June, 1965. Starting with the 20th Guldbagge Awards, held in 1985, the period of eligibility became the full previous calendar year from January 1 to December 31. The Awards presented at that ceremony were in respect of 18 months of film production owing to the changeover from the broken calendar year to the standard calendar year during 1984. Due to a mediocre film year, no awards ceremony was held in 1971.

International presence
As the Guldbagge Awards are based in Sweden and are centered on the Swedish film industry, the majority of Guldbagge Award winners have been Swedish. Nonetheless, there is significant international presence at the awards, as evidenced by the following list of winners of the Guldbagge Award for Best Director.
 Denmark: Per Fly
 Iceland: Hrafn Gunnlaugsson
 United Kingdom: Colin Nutley

However, no director has won for a film that is entirely in a foreign language.

Several international nominees include:
 Denmark: Susanne Bier and Bille August (nominated for 2 films)
 Germany: Rainer Hartleb

Notes and references

See also 
 Academy Award for Best Director
 BAFTA Award for Best Direction
 Golden Globe Award for Best Director 
 Directors Guild of America Award for Outstanding Directing – Feature Film

External links 
  
  
 

Director
Awards for best director
Director